Kakinada Municipal Corporation, also known as KMC is the civic body of Kakinada in the Indian state of Andhra Pradesh. The corporation has recently concluded its election term and is currently headed by the Special Officer, Krithika Shukla who happens to be the collector of Kakinada District.

Jurisdiction 

It started to expand from 1920, when it was only  and the population was just over 50,000. The urban agglomeration constituents includes the areas of Kakinada Municipal Corporation, census towns of Chidiga, Ramanayyapeta, Suryaraopeta and the out growths of Ganganapalle, Sarpavaram, Vakalapudi and Turangi.

Administration 

The corporation is administered by an elected body, headed by the mayor. 

The present commissioner of the corporation is K. Ramesh.

Functions 

Kakinada Municipal Corporation is created for the following functions:

 Planning for the town including its surroundings which are covered under its Department's Urban Planning Authority .

 Approving construction of new buildings and authorising use of land for various purposes.

 Improvement of the town's economic and Social status.

 Arrangements of water supply towards commercial,residential and industrial purposes.

 Planning for fire contingencies through Fire Service Departments.

 Creation of solid waste management,public health system and sanitary services.

 Working for the development of ecological aspect like development of Urban Forestry and making guidelines for environmental protection.

 Working for the development of weaker sections of the society like mentally and physically handicapped,old age and gender biased people.

 Making efforts for improvement of slums and poverty removal in the town.

Revenue sources 

The following are the Income sources for the Corporation from the Central and State Government.

Revenue from taxes 

Following is the Tax related revenue for the corporation.

 Property tax.

 Profession tax.

 Entertainment tax.

 Grants from Central and State Government like Goods and Services Tax.

 Advertisement tax.

Revenue from non-tax sources 

Following is the Non Tax related revenue for the corporation.

 Water usage charges.

 Fees from Documentation services.

 Rent received from municipal property.

 Funds from municipal bonds.

References

Kakinada
Municipal corporations in Andhra Pradesh
Year of establishment missing